El Diente Peak is a high summit in the San Miguel Mountains range of the Rocky Mountains of North America. "El Diente" is Spanish for "The Tooth", a reference to the shape of the peak.

Climbing
The topographic prominence of El Diente Peak is only , so by a strict  cutoff rule, it would not be counted as a separate peak from its higher neighbor Mount Wilson. However, the 3/4 mile (1.2 km) connecting ridge is a significant climbing challenge (Class 4/5), making El Diente more independent than its prominence would indicate.
Hence, it is often regarded as a full-fledged fourteener.

El Diente is one of the more dramatic peaks in Colorado in terms of local relief and steepness. As a result, it is one of the most challenging climbs among Colorado's fourteeners.  All routes involve at least class 3 scrambling on loose talus, and poor route-finding can expose the climber to more difficult and dangerous terrain.

Historical names
El Diente
El Diente Peak

See also

List of mountain peaks of Colorado
List of Colorado fourteeners

References

External links

 
 

Mountains of Colorado
Mountains of Dolores County, Colorado
North American 4000 m summits